Miloš Kovačević (born 31 March 1991) is a Montenegrin footballer who plays for Maldivian side United Victory.

Club career
Born in Vrbas, SR Serbia, he made his debut as senior playing in the 2008–09 Serbian SuperLiga with FK Hajduk Kula. During the winter break he would move to FK Mladost Apatin playing in the Serbian First League. He would start the 2009–10 season by playing on loan with FK Bačka Topola but in the winter break he would sign back with Hajduk Kula and thus return to top league football.

International career
At national team level, he has played with the Montenegrin U-19 team.

References

1991 births
Living people
People from Vrbas, Serbia
Association football defenders
Montenegrin footballers
Montenegro youth international footballers
FK Hajduk Kula players
FK Mladost Apatin players
FK TSC Bačka Topola players
RFK Novi Sad 1921 players
FK Sūduva Marijampolė players
FC Mika players
OFK Petrovac players
Maziya S&RC players
United Victory players
Serbian SuperLiga players
Serbian First League players
A Lyga players
Armenian Premier League players
Montenegrin First League players
Montenegrin expatriate footballers
Expatriate footballers in Lithuania
Montenegrin expatriate sportspeople in Lithuania
Expatriate footballers in Armenia
Montenegrin expatriate sportspeople in Armenia
Expatriate footballers in the Maldives
Montenegrin expatriate sportspeople in the Maldives